Lampronia stangei is a moth of the family Prodoxidae. It is found in Italy.

References

Moths described in 1903
Prodoxidae
Moths of Europe